"Do the Right Thing" is a song by American hip hop and new jack swing group Redhead Kingpin and the F.B.I. from their debut album, A Shade of Red (1989). The track was written for but not used in the Spike Lee film of the same name, but two years later, the song was featured on the soundtrack of Wes Craven's horror film The People Under the Stairs, playing over the end credits. The group's third single, "Do the Right Thing" became their highest-charting song, peaking at number 13 on the UK Singles Chart, number seven in the Netherlands, and number four in New Zealand.

Track listings

7-inch single
A. "Do the Right Thing" (U.S. radio mix) – 4:05
B. "A Shade of Red" – 4:47

US 12-inch single
A1. "Do the Right Thing" (Jazzy 12-inch) – 5:15
A2. "Do the Right Thing" (Jazzy 7-inch) – 3:34
B1. "Do the Right Thing" (Sky 12-inch) – 6:04
B2. "Do the Right Thing" (Sky instrumental) – 4:52

US cassette single
 "Do the Right Thing" (U.S. radio mix) – 4:04
 "Do the Right Thing" (12-inch mix) – 6:20

UK mini-CD single
 "Do the Right Thing" (U.S. radio mix) – 4:05
 "Do the Right Thing" (12-inch mix) – 6:20
 "A Shade of Red"

UK 12-inch single 1
A1. "Do the Right Thing" (12-inch mix) – 6:20
A2. "Do the Right Thing" (U.S. street mix) – 3:39
B1. "Do the Right Thing" (Butcher mix) – 2:25
B2. "Do the Right Thing" (acapella) – 2:30

UK 12-inch single 2
A1. "Do the Right Thing" (Happiness remix)
B1. "Do the Right Thing" (212 "Sky" King Remix)
B2. "Do the Right Thing" (Happiness 7-inch remix)

Charts

Weekly charts

Year-end charts

References

1989 singles
1989 songs
Songs written for films
Virgin Records singles